Gliese 367 b is an exoplanet orbiting the red dwarf star Gliese 367 (GJ 367), 31 light-years (9.5 parsecs) from Earth in the constellation of Vela. The exoplanet takes just 7.7 hours to orbit its star, one of the shortest orbits of any planet. Due to its close orbit, the exoplanet gets bombarded with radiation 500 times more than Earth receives from the Sun. Dayside temperatures on GJ 367b are around 1,500 °C (1,770 K; 2,730 °F).

Due to its close orbit, it most likely is tidally locked. The atmosphere of Gliese 367 b, due to the extreme temperatures, would have boiled away along with signs of life. The core of GJ 367b is likely composed of iron and nickel, making its core similar to Mercury's core. The core of GJ 367b is extremely dense, making up most of the planet's mass.

, Gliese 367 b is the smallest known exoplanet within 10 parsecs of the Solar System, and the second-least massive after Proxima Centauri d.

In August 2022, this planet and its host star were included among 20 systems to be named by the third NameExoWorlds project.

References 

Exoplanets in the Gliese Catalog
Vela (constellation)
Exoplanets discovered in 2021
Transiting exoplanets
Exoplanets detected by radial velocity
Exoplanets discovered by TESS